The Bassetki Statue is a monument from the Akkadian period (2350–2100 BCE) in Mesopotamia. It was discovered in the 1974 during road construction near the site of the village Bassetki (located near the road between Duhok and Zakho Duhok Governorate, northern Iraq) for military purposes. The pedestal contains an inscription in Akkadian, indicating that the statue once stood in the doorway of a palace of the Akkadian ruler Naram-Sin (reigned c. 2254–2218 BCE). 

The statue consists of a seated nude, male figure on a round base. The upper body and the head of the figure have not been preserved. It was cast from 98.2% pure copper using the lost-wax process. The statue weighs .

The Bassetki Statue contains a cuneiform inscription written in Old Akkadian. The inscription deals with the Akkadian ruler Naram-Sin (2254–2218 BCE), grandson and third successor of Sargon of Akkad, the founder of the Akkadian Empire. It recounts that, after Naram-Sin crushed a large-scale revolt against his rule, the inhabitants of the city of Akkad asked the gods to make Naram-Sin the god of their city, and that they built a temple for him in the middle of the city.

According to several scholars, the statue stands out for its naturalistic rendering of the human body. This naturalism was a new development characteristic for the Akkadian period.

Loss and recovery in 2003 invasion

The Bassetki Statue was among the many artifacts that were looted from the Iraq Museum during the 2003 invasion of Iraq. During the theft, it had been dropped several times, as could be determined from a trail of cracks in the floor of the museum. It was listed number 2 on a list of the 30 most-wanted antiquities that were stolen from the museum. Its recovery came about after the American 812th Military Police Company raided a house and arrested three people in October 2003. They revealed the location of the Bassetki Statue, which turned out to be coated in axle grease and hidden in a cesspool. It was subsequently fished out and displayed in the Iraq Museum on 11 November, together with over 800 stolen small objects that had also been retrieved.

See also
Art of Mesopotamia

Footnotes

External links
Video about the current excavations - Aug 18, 2020
Bassetki Statue at CDLI

23rd-century BC works
3rd-millennium BC sculptures
1974 archaeological discoveries
Akkadian Empire
Archaeological theft
Archaeological discoveries in Iraq
Copper sculptures in Iraq
Nude sculptures in Iraq
Objects in the National Museum of Iraq
Statues
Dohuk Governorate
Sculpture of the Ancient Near East
Stolen works of art